Ambicodamus is a genus of spiders in the family Nicodamidae. It was first described in 1995 by Mark Harvey. , it contains 11 species, all from Australia.

Species
Ambicodamus comprises the following species:
Ambicodamus audax Harvey, 1995
Ambicodamus crinitus (L. Koch, 1872)
Ambicodamus dale Harvey, 1995
Ambicodamus darlingtoni Harvey, 1995
Ambicodamus emu Harvey, 1995
Ambicodamus kochi Harvey, 1995
Ambicodamus leei Harvey, 1995
Ambicodamus marae Harvey, 1995
Ambicodamus sororius Harvey, 1995
Ambicodamus southwelli Harvey, 1995
Ambicodamus urbanus Harvey, 1995

References

Nicodamidae
Araneomorphae genera
Spiders of Australia